The Puerto Rico Electric Power Authority (PREPA; Spanish: LUMA, AEE) was an electric power company owned by the Commonwealth of Puerto Rico responsible for electricity generation, power distribution, and power transmission on the island. PREPA was the only entity authorized to conduct such business in Puerto Rico, making it a government monopoly, until on January 22, 2018, former governor of Puerto Rico, Ricardo Rossello, announced that all assets of the company will be sold in a general privatization of PREPA.

The authority was ruled by a board of directors appointed by the governor with the advice and consent of the Senate. After 2014, PREPA was subject to the Puerto Rico Energy Commission, another government agency whose board of directors was also appointed by the governor.

Hurricane Maria in September 2017 destroyed PREPA's distribution network, creating a blackout in all parts of the island.

History 
PREPA was originally named the Puerto Rico Water Resources Authority (PRWRA) which was created by Law No. 83 of May 2, 1941, during the governorship of Rexford G. Tugwell. Government-owned, PRWRA unified diverse regional and local electric power companies into one unified electric grid.

Maintenance budget
Over the years the budget for maintenance, such as clearing trees near power lines, has diminished: in 2007 it was $251 million and in 2014 it was $202 million.

Outages
Throughout its history, PREPA has suffered several outages that have left regions or the entire island of Puerto Rico without power.

In August 2012 14,000 residents where left without power following the passing of tropical storm Isaac.

One of these islandwide outages occurred on September 20, 2016, due to a fire at one of PREPA's plants—Central Aguirre.  All of Puerto Rico was without power for three days.

On occasion, entire sectors are reportedly left without power when an animal, such as a cat or an iguana, causes damage to the system.

In September 2021 demand for electricity exceeded supply, after mechanical and maintenance problems affected various power plants, resulting in four days of consecutive rolling blackouts. Central Aguirre and Palo Seco faced problems with the removal of seaweed since the filters to prevent the accumulation of such needed replacement. The power outages resulted in the cancellation of classes at the Pontifical Catholic University of Puerto Rico and a student protest at the University of Puerto Rico.

Hurricanes Irma and Maria

At the first days of September 2017, the eye of Hurricane Irma passed north of the island. The strong winds left 1 million residents without power. Power had been restored to 980,000 people by September 20, when Hurricane Maria struck, leaving nearly the entire island without power. Two weeks later, power had been restored to about 10% of customers. Full restoration took months, and many Puerto Ricans bought generators. Electric companies in unaffected areas ordinarily make contracts for speedy assistance to those hit by disaster, but in this case negotiations took weeks.

The initial $300 million contract for power restoration was given to Whitefish Energy, a Montana company which had only two employees on the day the hurricane struck. The award was controversial on those and other grounds, and was cancelled on October 29. By December 2017, the Army Corps of Engineers had other contractors in place, along with crews brought in through mutual aid agreements with utilities such as Con Edison.

Six weeks after Hurricane Maria, 30% of customers had been restored. After two months, almost half had been restored.

On January 6, 2018, representatives of FEMA,  the U.S. Army Corps of Engineers and their armed security details entered a Palo Seco warehouse owned by PREPA to obtain and distribute a massive store of spare parts were needed to restore grid power.  PREPA has been accused of hoarding the materials and hence delaying the restoration of power.  The equipment has since been distributed.

In January 2018, it had been predicted that generation would reach 95% by the following month, and 100% of customers would be restored by June 2018.

On April 18, 2018, an accident at a transmission line knocked out the electrical grid of Puerto Rico. All the island lost power. The following afternoon, PREPA announced that service had been restored to 97% of customers, the same percentage as before this blackout. 40,000 customers were still out of service due to the hurricane seven months earlier.

With June 1 the official start of the 2018 hurricane season, an estimated 11,000+ customers remained without power, possibly for another two months. Although an estimated $3.8B was spent on power grid work since the September hurricanes, the grid is still considered fragile and vulnerable. PREPA announced a $500M one-year master services agreement with MasTec for further power grid reconstruction and modernization services.

Costa Sur Power Plant 
As a result of the 2019–20 Puerto Rico earthquakes the Costa Sur Power Plant located in Guayanilla was knocked out of service.  An estimated 327,000 clients where left without power and many as a result without water service. The President of the AEE/PREPA, Jose Ortiz, informed there was extensive damage in the facilities and that repairs would take more than a year. FEMA assigned $238 million to help cover cost related to backup units which are used to meet the demand previously covered by Costa Sur.

Controversial  1.5 billion fossil fuels project  
In 2017, during Hurricane Maria an unsolicited offer by New Fortress Energy was made to PREPA.  In 2020, a court order required the awarded-contract documents be made public and showed several irregularities including that the company doesn't have a liquid-gas production track record in Puerto Rico and that rather than go through a bidding process, the contract was approved quickly. Chris Christie, the former governor of New Jersey was listed as a paid lobbyist for PREPA, in the documents. Ingrid Vila Biaggi, the former Puerto Rico Chief of Staff, made a request for an independent investigation. In 2021 various environmental groups requested the cancellation of the contract.

LUMA Energy 

In June 2020 governor Wanda Vázquez Garced and the AEE/PREPA signed a contract with LUMA Energy that would give the company control of the AEE/PREPA electric grid for 15 years. The meeting in which the contract (which contains over 300 pages in length)  was approved lasted only 43 minutes. 

The UTIER along with the other unions of the authority expressed disapproval of the contract, organized strikes and submitted amendments to the contract.  
The Puerto Rico House of Representatives called for postponing the contract until 2022 and launched an investigation into the contract.

Structure

Board of directors 
PREPA's board of directors serves as the authority's governing body, with a membership that usually consists of private citizens entrusted with representing the public interest and may or may not include exofficio political officeholders (typically the Secretary of Economic Development and Commerce). Three members of the board are directly elected by consumers by plurality-at-large; two of them by residential consumers and one by commercial ones. However, when both the governor and the legislature belong to the same party, one of the earliest laws amended by the legislature is the one governing PREPA's board composition. The governor is usually required to appoint four members with the advice and consent of the Senate, who along with the incumbent political officeholders which serve in ex officio capacity effectively render the authority a partisan tool rather than an electric utility.

The last structural change to the board occurred on June 11, 2018, after governor Ricardo Rossello.

Labor unions 
There are four labor unions that represent the workers from the authority exclusively UTIER, UITICE, UEPI, and UPAEE. In 2021 three of the five unions will disband due to the LUMA energy contract.

Energy sources 
The majority of Puerto Rico's electricity is generated using oil and natural gas fired power plants. Puerto Rico also has 21 reservoirs that produce hydroelectric energy.

In 2019 the Puerto Rican government passed legislation requiring the closure of coal fired power plants by 2028 and achieving 100% renewable energy by 2050. A report in 2021 criticized the government for delays in processing applications for electrical interconnection. At the time of said report only 327 applications where approved, representing 0.09% of the total.

In 2021 the government unveiled plans for the Puerto Rico Ocean Technology Complex (PROtech) an Ocean thermal energy conversion project on the southeast coast.

Power plants

PREPA serves close to 1.5 million customers through several power plants (as of 2015): In 2020 the agency continues to report that it serves 1.5 million customers.

Subsidiaries
The public corporation also provides fiber optic broadband to private carriers through one of its subsidiary, PREPA Networks. PREPA is also studying the possibility of selling energy to the United States Virgin Islands with the installation of an underwater power cable between Fajardo and the island of St. Thomas—similar to the power cable with which it services its clients in the island municipalities of Vieques and Culebra.

Finances

As of 2014 the authority carries liabilities of US$10.1 billion against assets of $6 billion. It also operates with a deficit of about $354 million against revenues of $4.8 billion. In terms of costs, $2.6 billion or about 58% of PREPA's expenses are attributed to fuel purchases alone while salaries and collective bargains represent less than 13% of the authority's expenses.

On May 23, 2014, Citigroup severely curtailed PREPA's line of credit for fuel purchase, forcing PREPA to run out of cash to pay Petrobras, its main oil supplier. Petrobras, in turn, threatened to cut off further shipments to the authority. This forced the authority to take $100 million out of its Capital Improvements Fund in order to pay its debt to Petrobras. PREPA argues that the different agencies of the government of Puerto Rico owe them more than $290 million in debt, while an additional $375 million of revenue is lost through subsidies enacted by the Puerto Rican legislature. An additional $600 million is owed to the authority by residential and commercial consumers, some of them by consumers living in public housing. The authority argues that it wouldn't have a problem being self-sufficient if it were paid the aforementioned debt and if it weren't forced to give out subsidies. On June 3, 2014, senator Ramón Luis Nieves admitted publicly that, "part of the financial problem at PREPA was provoked by the government and the Puerto Rican legislature."

On June 11, 2014, Fitch Ratings downgraded its rating on the authority's to speculative non-investment grade ("junk status") from BB+ to BB while putting the authority on negative rating watch. PREPA filed for bankruptcy in July 2017.

PREPAs' two largest creditors are OppenheimerFunds and Franklin Templeton.

As of 2021 the payment of PREPA's debt remains in an indefinite "limbo" due to a lack of agreement between the government of Puerto Rico and bond holders. PREPA's debt totals over $9 billion and according to David Skeel, the new president of the Financial Oversight and Management Board for Puerto Rico, it will have to be renegotiated in light of the COVID-19 pandemic. Additional to a lack of progress on debt negotiation a 2020 law passed due to the COVID-19 pandemic in Puerto Rico halted cutting service to clients who failed to pay their utility bills, this resulted in a decrease in the earnings of the agency.

Investigations by the office of the Comptroller revealed from 2010 to 2018 the AEE had mismanaged $192 million on projects without utility.

In March 2021 the AEE announced increase in electric bills for the next three months equivalent to an average of $12 more on clients bills. As part of the contract with LUMA Energy, the AEE has begun transferring funds to LUMA, including $128 million sent by April 2021.

Gallery

References

External links
 
 GRID INNOVATIONS Puerto Rico Grid: Build Back Better

Electric power companies of Puerto Rico
Government-owned corporations of Puerto Rico
Energy companies established in 1941
1941 establishments in Puerto Rico